This article summarizes the outcomes of matches including FIFA recognised, unofficial and matches played against club teams by the India national under-23 football team.

Legend

1990s

1991

1995

1999

2000s

2002

2003

2004

2006

2007

2010s

2010

2011

2012

2014

2015

2016

2017

2018

2019

2020s

2021

External links
 RSSSF DATABASE
 Indian Football

India national under-23 football team
India national football team results